Revelations – The Initial Journey is a 2002 TV series, produced by Cloud 9 Screen Entertainment Group in New Zealand. The stories are told through the narrator who is called Jess and played by Tom Hern. Each episode contains a story from a different time and place in world history. The show ran for one season and it had 26 half-hour episodes.

Cast and characters 
Characters who did not get any lines are not included.

 Tom Hern as Jess
 Ben Barrington as Mathius / Prison Guard No. 1
 Paul Rawson as Joe Hirst
 Danielle Mason as Sarah / Pretty Girl
 Kelson Henderson as Tugen
 Daniel Costello as Sean
 Todd Rippon as Hugo Brant
 Marama Jackson as Mary Welbourne
 Gerald Bryan as Walter Looms
 Beth Allen as Anna Chase
 Stephen Gledhill as Martin Chase
 Michelle Amas as Janet Chase
 Lee Donoghue as Mike
 Paul McLaughlin as Bill
 Amelia Reynolds as Kate
 Di O'Connell as Television Reporter
 Stephen Bain as Anna's Doctor
 Marc Appleby as Derek
 Miriama McDowell as Dorcas Miller
 Danielle Mason as Sarah Kent
 Josephine Davison as Anne Miller
 Stephen Lovatt as George Kent
 Geoffrey Heath as Reverend William Judd
 Guylaine Michel as Hepsibah
 Steven Ray as Witch Finder
 Betty Adams as Woman #1
 Mark Ruka as Tuku
 Vicky Rodewyk as Vaani
 Peter Vere-Jones as John Buchanan
 Lani Tupu Snr. as Chief Finau
 Johnny Bond as Captain
 David Telford as Cleaver Jackson
 Charlotte Woollams as Perdita Jackson
 Damon Andrews as Harvey
 Lewis Rowe as Cleaver's Doctor
 Errol Wright as Peter
 John Smythe as Headman
 Nick Brown as Barman
 Aaron James Murphy as Billy
 Arty Papageorgiou as Bully Boy
 Hannah Armstrong as Girl 1
 Hannah Holland as Girl 2
 Alison Boyd as Ma
 Molly Macdonald as Molly
 Geoffrey Snell as Pa
 Don Langridge as Sheriff
 Mathew Hegan as Teacher
 Brian Sergent as Lysias
 Irene Wood as Judith
 Chantelle Brader as Sarah
 Emily Shute as Hannah
 Toby Leach as Matthias
 Richard Knowles as Roman Officer
 Inia Maxwell as Man No. 1
 Stephen Butterworth as Jesus
 Miriama Smith as Anaka
 Maiava Eteuati Ete as Two Tiger
 Sarah Johnston as Kalu
 George Henare as Bazal
 Jesse Jardine as Warrior #1
 Grant Roa as Warrior #2
 Rachel House as Ocelot
 Zion Trigger as Poc a Toc
 Kat Angus as Julia
 Belinda Bretton as Ivy
 Maria Penney as Donna
 Daniel James as Danny
 David Taylor as Carl
 Carmel McGlone as Mrs. Wesley
 Dennis Proctor as Coach Ericsson
 Jon Brazier as Ford
 Grant Bridger as Dyer
 Jed Brophy as Pieter
 Morgan Palmer-Hubbard as Aran Woods
 Rachel Batty as Ruth Woods
 Will Harris as Ben Woods
 Matt Chamberlain as Father
 Matt Spicer as Bandit No. 1
 Pua Magasiva as Greg Davies
 Morgan Fairhead as Kim
 Jacinta Wawatai as Sandy Davies
 Jade Williams as Helen
 Ryan Runciman as Carl
 Perry Piercy as Mrs. Davies
 Dave Fane as Mr. Davies
 Charles Lum as Lao Fong
 Keith Chau as Kai
 Sally Martin as Annie
 Keegan Fulford-Wierzbicki as Tully
 Lyndon Keenan as Biffo
 Ari Boyland as Pig
 Desmond Kelly as Solomon
 Jocelyn Christian as Pasha
 Karras Van Der Made as Helena
 Jim Moriarty as Amal
 Taika Cohen as Ali
 David McKenzie as Saul
 Daniel Northcott as David
 Mia Koning as Myrtle
 Eve Carvell as Maude
 Dai Henwood as Carlos
 Colin Moy as Phil
 Jacob Tomuri as Jacob
 Simon Gibbes as Jonty
 Vanessa Werner as Maureen
 Alistair Browning as Patrick
 Tina Regtien as Cathleen
 Cameron Rhodes as Jimmy Galbraith
 Peter Corrigan as Mick
 Renee Ellwood as Annie Collins
 Meryl Cassie as Lucy James
 Tim Dale as Wayne
 Jason Gascoigne as Billy
 Julia Shardlow as Peggy-Sue
 Amy Todd as Tammy
 Monty Asare as Old Joe
 Richard Lambeth as Henry
 Wanjiku Sanderson as Mamie
 John Wraight as Mr. Collins
 Michael Wilson as Mr. Irving
 Tom McLeod as Tommy Love
 Chelsie Preston Crayford as April
 Joanne Mildenhall as Darlene
 Edward Campbell as Herb
 Carolyn McLaughlin as Tracy
 Lucy Wigmore as Presenter
 Marie-Louise Williams as Reporter No. 1
 Amy Tarleton as Reporter No. 2
 Sam Masina as Reporter No. 3
 Larry Rew as Aviner
 Charlie Bleakley as Daniil
 Hannah Costello as Elkie
 Shane Bartle as Ruel
 Duncan Sarkies as Kalev
 Ralph Johnson as Prefect
 Stig Eldred as Morgan
 Winston Harris as Arun
 Jane Waddell as Arun's Aunt
 Andrew Kovacevich as Morgan's Heckler
 Joseph Mika-Hunt as Town Folk Leader
 Janine Burchett as Isabelle
 Salesi Le'ota as Phillipe
 Nicholas Hopkins as Albert
 Aidan Grealish as Alain
 Joe Ballard as Jean
 K.C. Kelly as Pierre
 Chris Ryan as Young Man
 Caleb Ross as Samuel
 Julian Wilson as Josiah
 Barret Irwin as Caleb
 Alicia Fulford-Wierzbicki as Ruth
 James McCaskill as Heckler & Thief
 Celia Nicholson as Samuel's Mother
 Lucas Hayward as Aaron
 Emma Deakin as Woman No. 1
 Lewis Martin as Judge
 Stuart Devenie as Brandon
 Laura Wilson as Hannah
 Drew Neemia as Jack
 Anne Budd as Kate
 Richard Edge as Thomas
 Sally Spencer-Harris as Gertrude
 John Sumner as Walter Goldburn
 Dra McKay as Maisy

References

External links 

New Zealand drama television series
2002 New Zealand television series debuts
2002 New Zealand television series endings